Mauricio Héctor Pineda (born 13 July 1975 in Buenos Aires) is an Argentine former professional footballer who played as a defender. He appeared for Argentina at the 1998 World Cup, scoring their winning goal in their final group match against Croatia.

In 1992, Pineda represented Argentina U23 at the 1992 CONMEBOL Pre-Olympic Tournament in Paraguay, which saw Argentina fail to qualify for the 1992 Summer Olympics.

Honours
Udinese
UEFA Intertoto Cup: 2000

References

External links

 Argentine Primera statistics

1975 births
Living people
Footballers from Buenos Aires
Association football defenders
Argentine footballers
Boca Juniors footballers
Club Atlético Huracán footballers
Club Atlético Colón footballers
Club Atlético Lanús footballers
Udinese Calcio players
RCD Mallorca players
S.S.C. Napoli players
Cagliari Calcio players
Expatriate footballers in Spain
Expatriate footballers in Italy
Argentine expatriate sportspeople in Italy
Argentine expatriate sportspeople in Spain
Argentine expatriate footballers
Argentina international footballers
1998 FIFA World Cup players
1997 Copa América players
Olympic footballers of Argentina
Olympic silver medalists for Argentina
Footballers at the 1996 Summer Olympics
Argentine Primera División players
Serie A players
Serie B players
Olympic medalists in football
Medalists at the 1996 Summer Olympics